Timimoun District is a district of Timimoun Province, Algeria. According to the 2008 census it has a population of 41,279.

Communes
The district is further divided into 2 communes:
Timimoun
Ouled Said

References

Districts of Adrar Province